Category 6: Day of Destruction is a 2004 four-hour television miniseries that was broadcast in the United States on CBS in two parts, with the first part aired on November 14 and the second on November 17. It was later released to DVD on February 15, 2005. The miniseries focuses primarily on the city of Chicago as three unusual storm systems approach from the west, north and south and combine over the city to form a massive hurricane. At the same time a hacker-induced power outage cuts communications leaving a journalist and power officials scrambling to find the cause.

The miniseries was a success for CBS in terms of ratings, as it was the highest-rated movie for the channel in two years, and it earned the highest ratings during the November sweeps week with 19.4 million viewers watching the first part. Critics were less favorable towards the film, with most panning the film for its dialog, implausible science, and poor acting. Some reviewers did praise the film's high-budget special effects and felt the film had at least some "charm." In November 2005 a four-hour sequel, Category 7: The End of the World, aired in the same two-part format.

Plot  
Andy Goodman (Brian Dennehy) is a week away from a forced retirement from his position as chief meteorologist at the National Weather Administration's Severe Weather Center. However, tornadoes level Las Vegas, an area normally not prone to the storms. Concerned and upset that the storm system formed unnoticed and that they were unable to warn the people, Goodman begins closely tracking the system. Goodman receives field reports from his friend "Tornado Tommy" (Randy Quaid) and assistance from new intern Sabrina Rogers (Alicia Johnston). As time passes, he realizes the system is heading towards Chicago, joined by an unusual warm storm coming from the south, which is already causing a record-breaking heat wave in the city, and an abnormally early cold front from the Arctic.

Meanwhile, Mitch Benson (Thomas Gibson), the Chief of Operations at Midwest Electric, is struggling to keep power going to the residents because the six-week heat wave is straining the system and residents are refusing to follow power conservation requests. To get more energy, he is working with the company's largest supplier, Lexer, but the company's CEO is trying to find new ways to profit from this crisis. Benson also finds himself caught in a conflict of interest as he is having an affair with the Lexer's public relations representative, Rebecca Kerns (Chandra West).

Ambitious reporter Amy Harkin (Nancy McKeon) is stuck reporting on the heat wave while trying to find proof behind the scenes that Lexer and Midwest are responsible for the lack of sufficient power. The Secretary of Energy, Shirley Abbott (Dianne Wiest), is actively warning various politicians and the president that the power grid is too outdated to handle real natural disasters and that it is too vulnerable to attack. Dan London (Ari Cohen), the chief engineer of Lexer, has also repeatedly warned Lexer that their systems are too vulnerable to hackers, but the company is only interested in going with the cheapest options. He decides to blow the whistle on the company to Harkin, but as he refuses to appear on camera, Harkin's boss will not allow the piece to air.

As the storms approach, early storms knock out the city's primary power generating plant, and Benson is forced to negotiate with Lexer for even more power. Not realizing the devastating nature of the storms coming, London sets out to force Lexer to listen to his warnings by hacking the system and causing a cascading chain reaction that knocks out all of the power in Chicago. Goodman and his team are unable to warn the citizens that the storms have formed into a category 6 hurricane over the Great Lakes and will hit Chicago head on.

Harkin realizes what happened to the power and rushes to find London, while Benson and Secretary Abbott gather energy from a multitude of other companies to get around the breakdown at Lexer. Unaware of what each party is doing, London quickly reverses the hacks at the same time as the energy starts flowing in from other companies. This overloads the system, knocking out the entire Midwest power grid as the storm hits the city and London is killed in the process.

Unable to do anything further, Benson rushes to find his family after he receives word that they are trapped at a mall  and that his daughter has been accidentally shot by her ex-boyfriend. "Tornado Tommy" drives around the city filming tornadoes and is oblivious to another tornado that is headed to his direction. He puts his camcorder in a suitcase and throws it out his window and he is sucked in the tornado. Harkin gives Benson a ride to the mall to pick up his family, then they go to rescue her pregnant sister-in-law from an elevator. After Amy's cameraman is injured while rescuing her sister-in-law, Harkin stays behind with him and their neighbor. The others rush to reach the airport during the 15-minute eye of the hurricane, where they are picked up in a plane piloted by Harkin's brother, an air force weather pilot. After the storm passes, Harkin keeps her promise and tells London's story on air.

Cast 
Source:
 Thomas Gibson as Mitch Benson
 Nancy McKeon as Amy Harkin
 Chandra West as Rebecca Kerns
 Brian Markinson as Chris Haywood
 Nancy Ann Sakovich as Jane Benson
 Randy Quaid as "Tornado Tommy" Dixon
 Dianne Wiest as Energy Secretary Shirley Abbott
 Brian Dennehy as Andy Goodman
 Ari Cohen as Dan London
 Christopher Shyler as Craig Shilts
 Arnold Pinnock as Jason
 Chad Willett as Jeff Harkin
 Horis McLaren as Helen Travers
 Janaya Stephens as Laura Harkin
 Petra Wildgoose as Lindsey Benson
 Jeff Sutton as Garth Benson
 Jeff Clarke as George Kiley
 Alicia Johnston as Sabrina Rogers
 Amanda Brugel as Leslie Singer
 Ryan Kennedy as Eric
 Andrew Jackson as Walt Ashley
 Kjartan Hewitt as Tad (credited as Kerr Hewitt)
 Trevor Botkin as Rick
 David Lawrence Brown as Control Center Engineer
 Dean McKenzie as Bob
 Dave Price as Engineer
 Brian Frank as Sammy Slots
 Rebecca Gibson as Honey
 Brian Kawakami as Mr. Yoshiko
 Junko Bailey as Japanese Woman
 Ryan Schenk as Paramedic

Production 
Executive producer Bob Sertner wanted the film to have higher-end special effects to mimic the quality of those seen in feature films.  To do this, the film uses visual computer effects created by special effects company Area 51 FX, which created over 100 different shots using the digital modeling program LightWave 3D. During shooting, special effect supervisor Craig Weiss noted that the scenes with Randy Quaid were particularly difficult to capture on film due to his appearing in multiple scenes where his character was chased by twisters and surrounded by their destructive aftermaths. The actors also faced new challenges, as the film often replaced traditional green screen setup, where the special effects were added during editing, with live shots taken with the effects in place at the same time. Nancy McKeon, who was pregnant with her first child during production, filmed some of her scenes using a green screen. She found the experience to be fun, noting that it challenges actors to use their imaginations while performing. She also found it easy to play a television reporter due to her being a self-admitted "news junkie."

Unable to find wind machines powerful enough to mimic hurricane-force winds, Sertner brought in a jet engine to aim at the actors and props during necessary scenes. Three dimensional storyboards, called animatics, were used to allow the filmmakers to see what a scene would look like before shooting, using a digital version of the actors. The various weather scenes blended together stock footage of real natural disasters with the computer-generated shots, with care taken to match up the details of the various scenes.

Release 
Category 6 was initially aired in the United States on CBS as a two-part, four-hour miniseries. The first part aired on Sunday, November 14, 2004, and the second followed on Wednesday, November 17, 2004. It was later aired in Australia on February 12, 2005.

The miniseries was first released to Region 1 DVD by CBS Television on February 15, 2005. On February 13, 2007, Lions Gate Entertainment released it, together with fellow disaster miniseries 10.5, as a two feature set.

The full miniseries aired in Jamaica on Television Jamaica in 2017.

Reception 
The miniseries was highly successful for CBS, as 19.4 million viewers tuned in to the first part of the film and made it the channel's best-rated Sunday night movie in over two years. The second part was watched by 17 million viewers, the highest number of viewers for the channel on a Wednesday night for the fall season. Together, the two parts helped to push the channel to the top spot for the year's November sweeps week.

Despite the high ratings, the film was generally panned by critics, except for almost universal praise for the high-budget special effects. New York Magazine'''s John Leonard found it lacking compared to the feature film The Day After Tomorrow, though he did feel it had a certain "raffish zombie charm." Charlie McCollum of the San Jose Mercury News called it a "third-rate disaster flick — with lame dialogue, voodoo science and wooden performances — spread out over two nights and four seemingly endless hours." Aaron Barnhart of the Kansas City Star agreed, feeling the filmmakers spent their budget on special effects to the detriment of the film's dialog. He called the film an "assault on common sense" for positing the idea that the power outage would keep everyone in Chicago from knowing that "something bad" was coming. Daily Variety found the film to be full of clichés and felt the side plots gave the appearance that the film was cast first and that the plot had been written to work around the actors. In comparing the film to a Reese's Peanut Butter Cup, the magazine notes that it had "two or more disastrous taste treats providing a very loud macro backdrop to the micro tales that play out involving the characters." Kay McFadden of the Seattle Times also felt the storm became a backdrop "for a contrived soap opera that could take place in sunshine or rain" and that the special effects were fun, but did not feel properly integrated into their scenes.

The Chicago Tribunes Sid Smith found the film to be "pretty lousy, despite a wealth of impressive special effects that end with an image of a completely demolished Chicago skyline." He found the plot to be overly melodramatic and "hokey" with an excessive amount of coincidences and ill-fortunes thrown at the characters, despite the performances of the star-studded cast. Australia's The Age'' gave the film a slightly more favorable review, praising the stunts and special effects, though it noted the effects suffer from poor computer editing and referred to the film as "a little entertaining supertrash" that does require one to not think too much about the science to enjoy.

References

External links 
 Official site
 
 
 

2004 television films
2004 films
2000s disaster films
2000s thriller films
American disaster films
CBS network films
Films shot in Winnipeg
Disaster television films
Films directed by Dick Lowry
2000s American films